Loz Wildbore (birth unknown) is an English rugby league footballer who has played in the 2000s and 2010s.

References

External links
Statistics at rugby.widnes.tv
 These are the confirmed squad numbers and names for the 2010 season. Profiles will follow...

Living people
English rugby league players
Doncaster R.L.F.C. players
Featherstone Rovers players
Hull Kingston Rovers players
Place of birth missing (living people)
Rugby league five-eighths
Rugby league fullbacks
Rugby league locks
South Wales Scorpions players
Widnes Vikings players
Year of birth missing (living people)
York City Knights players
Rugby articles needing expert attention